
 

Gogra
(also referred to as Nala Junction)
is a pasture and campsite in the Ladakh union territory of India, near its disputed border with China. It is located in the Kugrang River valley, a branch valley of Chang Chenmo Valley, where the Changlung River flows into Kugrang. During the times of the British Raj, Gogra was a halting spot for travellers to Central Asia via the 'Chang Chenmo route', who proceeded through the Changlung river valley and the Aksai Chin plateau.

In the late 1950s, China began to claim the Changlung river valley as its own territory. Clashes occurred here during the 1962 Sino-Indian War. During the 2020–2022 skirmishes, the area around Gogra was again a scene of conflict, and continues to be a subject of active dispute between the two countries.

Geography 

The Chang Chenmo ("Great Northern") Valley lies in a depression between the Karakoram Range in the north and the Chang Chenmo Range in the south.
The Changchenmo river flows through the depression, originating near Lanak La and joining the Shyok River in the west.

Immediately to the north of Chang Chenmo, the Karakoram range divides into multiple branches, between which lie the Kugrang Valley and Changlung Valley, both running northwest–southeast. The Kugrang river flows southeast within territory under present Indian control, joining the Chang Chenmo River near Hot Springs (also called Kyam or Kayam). The Changlung river flows in territory under present Chinese control, but bends southwest a little above this junction and flows into the Kugrang River near the pasture of Gogra.
The combined river of Kugrang and Changlung is much more voluminous than the Changchenmo stream flowing from Lanak La, so much so that Hedin regarded Changchenmo as a tributary of Kugrang.

Gogra thus forms a key link, connecting the Kugrang valley, Changlung valley and Chang Chenmo.
It was also called "Nala Junction" or "Nullah Junction" (junction of rivers) by the Indian military in the 1950s and 1960s.

The Chang Chenmo river as well as its tributaries flow on gravel beds which are essentially barren. The valleys are dotted with occasional alluvial patches where vegetation is found. Hot Springs and Gogra are two such patches. They were historical halting places for travellers and trading caravans, with a supply of water, fuel and fodder. Nomadic Ladakhi graziers also used them for grazing cattle.

Eight miles to the north of Gogra along the Changlung valley is a second hot spring, currently known by its Chinese name Wenquan. Here, a one-foot tall jet of hot water at 150 °F is said to emanate from a rounded boulder. Several other warm springs are also present in the vicinity. China established a military post at this location in 1962.

About two miles west of Wenquan, Changlung is joined by a tributary called Shamal Lungpa from the northeast. It provided a popular route to the Lingzithang plains via the Changlung Burma pass. About a mile upstream from the mouth of the stream is a camping ground of the same name, which was regarded as the next stage from Gogra for travellers.

History 

The first European to traverse Gogra was Adolf Schlagintweit in 1857, accompanied by his Yarkandi guide Mohammed Amin. It is said that his men had to dig steps in the Changlung valley for the ponies to ascend the slope. Schlagintweit went on to Nischu and the Aksai Chin plateau via this route. Then he proceeded to Yarkand, where he was killed in an insurrection.

Amin later entered the service of the Punjab department of trade in British India. With his information, the British were inspired to develop a trade route between Punjab and Yarkand via this route, which came to be called the "Chang Chenmo route". They signed a treaty with the Maharaja of Jammu and Kashmir, who was persuaded to "develop" the route. A sarai (rest house) with facilities was built at Gogra and was stocked with grains and supplies for travellers. The route was in use between 1870–1884, but did not prove to be popular with the traders. It was abandoned in 1884.

The Kugrang valley and Gogra also formed a popular hunting spot for British officers on leave.

Sino-Indian border dispute 

After India became independent in 1947 and China took control of Tibet in 1950, both the countries laid claim to the Aksai Chin plateau. In its 1956 border definition, China claimed the Chang Chenmo Valley up to the Kongka Pass, near Kayam Hot Springs, but excluded the majority of the eastern Karakoram range. In particular, the Changlung valley, Shamal Lungpa campsite and the Wenquan hot spring were all left as Indian territory. (Map 4)

Not recognising Chinese claims, India continued to send border patrols in "all directions". In 1957, one party went via Gogra and Shamal Lungpa to Dehra Compass, Sumdo and Karatagh Pass. Finding telltale signs of Chinese activity, the border police decided to strengthen outposts by stocking them with essentials at Kayam Hot Springs and Shamal Lungpa. In 1958, the border police again used this route to go to the Sarigh Jilganang lake and to the Ladakh border, planting an Indian flag at the latter location. In 1959, a police party sent to set up police posts at Tsogtsalu, Hot Springs and Shamal Lungpa was confronted by Chinese troops when it tried to reconnoitre in the Chinese claimed area, and a serious clash occurred. The ensuing Kongka Pass incident exacerbated tensions between the two countries.

After the Kongka Pass incident, the two countries engaged in serious negotiations. A summit between the prime ministers Jawaharlal Nehru and Zhou En-lai was held in 1960, where Zhou is believed to have proposed  an "east west swap" of disputed territories. India is believed to have rejected such a barter. Sector-by-sector border discussions were held later in 1960 between the officials of the two countries, where China enlarged its border claims. (See Map 4.) In the vicinity of the Kugrang valley, the Chinese officials declared:

The new "1960 claim line" meant that China laid claim to the entire basin of the Changlung river, stopping just before its confluence with the Kugrang river. Even then, the "approximately" described coordinates, are problematic in that they lie within the Kugrang river valley, dropping below the watershed. The place where the "watershed between the Kugrang Tsangpo River and Changlung River" crosses the Changlung River is determined by Indians to be , where a post called "Nala Jn" was established by them.

1962 standoff 

In the summer of 1962, sensing that China was trying to advance to its 1960 claim line, India initiated what came to be called the "forward policy", setting up advance posts in the territory between the 1960 and 1956 claim lines. The 1/8 Gorkha Riles battalion was ordered to set up a post in the upper reaches of the Galwan River. Setting out from Phobrang, the platoon first established a base at Kayam Hot Springs. A platoon of the 'A' Company then moved towards Galwan in July 1962. Along the way it set up a post near Gogra called "Nala Jn". The date of establishment of the post was 2 July 1962.

By this time, the Chinese troops already had a post at Shamal Lungpa. (Map 4, blue line) So the Nala Jn post would appear to be a defensive post meant to secure the Kugrang valley. The Gorkha Rifles used an alternative route through the Kugrang valley to Galwan, setting up a post in its vicinity on 5 July. Despite a seriously threatening posture by the Chinese troops, the post held firm and remained intact until the beginning of the war in October 1962. It was supplied by air. Despite a supply route having been established through the Kugrang Valley, it was seen that its use would be provocative.

1962 war 
The Sino-Indian War began in the western sector on 19 October 1962. The Chinese attacked all Indian posts that were beyond their 1960 claim line. The Nala Jn post, which was technically beyond the line, was also fired upon. The section of troops manning the post sustained some casualties. Their telephone line was also cut. So the commander sent two men to the Hot Springs base to report the firing, and a reinforcement of a section of troops arrived on 25 October. However, the Chinese did not attack the post, and it remained intact till the end of the war.

The Line of Actual Control resulting from the war remained on the dividing ridge between the Kugrang and Changlung valleys.

2020–2022 standoff 

In April 2020, Chinese forces amassed on the border of Ladakh and started intruding into previously uncontrolled territory at several points. Gogra was one of them. Indian forces had their base at the Karam Singh Post near Hot Springs, and periodically patrolled up to the location of the erstwhile "Nala Jn" post on the Line of Actual Control, now called Patrol Point 17A (PP-17A). Around 5 May, clusters of Chinese forces appeared in its vicinity and soon blocked the Indian forces from patrolling up to this point. The Indian Army moved troops to the border in a counter deployment effort, which was completed by early June.

On 6 June 2020, the senior military commanders of the sides met at the Chushul–Moldo Border Personnel Meeting point, and agreed to a "disengagement" of forward troops, to be followed by an eventual "de-escalation". However, this was not followed through. Inexplicably, there was no pull-back at Gogra and Hot Springs. At the Galwan valley, the Chinese forces continued to remain at the disputed border point, leading to a clash between the two sides on 15 June.

Following the clash, the Chinese forces doubled down at all the friction points. Near Gogra, the Chinese forces came down 2–4 km from the Line of Actual Control, and set up posts close to Gogra itself.  According to Lt. Gen. H. S. Panag, "the Chinese intrusion here [near Gogra] denies India access to nearly 30-35 km long and 4-km wide Kugrang river valley beyond Gogra.". It took several months and 10 rounds of talks between the military commanders to agree on the first pull-back in February 2021, viz., at Fingers 4–8 on the bank of the Pangong Lake. In the 12th round of talks in August 2021, the two sides agreed to disengage at Gogra. It was reported that troops of both the sides dismantled all temporary structures and allied infrastructure and moved back from forward positions.

However, a de-escalation has not yet taken place. Both the sides continue to claim the area in dispute, and continue to deploy troops in strength behind the forward lines. India has demanded the status quo ante April 2020 to be restored, while China is believed to insist upon imposing the "1959 claim line", either by physical denial or via a "buffer zone".

See also
 Kongka Pass
 Jianan Pass

Notes

References

Bibliography

External links
 Remembering supreme sacrifice of martyrs of CRPF on this day at Hot springs, Ladakh in 1959 - ITBP Twitter

Chang Chenmo Valley